Montevideo  is a city in Chippewa County, Minnesota, United States. The population was 5,383 at the 2010 census. It is the county seat of Chippewa County. The town's mayor is Erich Winter, and the Council President is Nathan Schmidt.

The area around Montevideo was populated by Native Americans and fur traders during the first half of the 19th Century. After the Dakota War of 1862, the US government opened the area to homesteaders. Railroads were built, and settlers followed, including Civil War veterans, Norwegians, Germans, Swedes, Dutch, and Irish. Montevideo was incorporated in 1879.

Geography

The surrounding topography is dominated by farmland and prairies, as well as river valleys with many scenic overlooks and small bluffs.

Climate
Montevideo, like the rest of Minnesota, has a four-season humid continental climate with great differences between summer and winter. The station recorded data from 1891 to 2019.

Demographics

2010 census
As of the census of 2010, there were 5,383 people, 2,326 households, and 1,404 families living in the city. The racial makeup of the city was 92.0% White, 0.6% African American, 0.7% Native American, 0.5% Asian, 4.6% from other races, and 1.5% from two or more races. Hispanic or Latino of any race were 8.4% of the population.

There were 2,326 households, of which 28.0% had children under the age of 18 living with them, 44.5% were married couples living together, 11.1% had a female householder with no husband present, 4.8% had a male householder with no wife present, and 39.6% were non-families. 35.1% of all households were made up of individuals, and 18.2% had someone living alone who was 65 years of age or older. The average household size was 2.25 and the average family size was 2.86.

The median age in the city was 41 years. 23.4% of residents were under the age of 18; 8% were between the ages of 18 and 24; 23.1% were from 25 to 44; 25% were from 45 to 64; and 20.3% were 65 years of age or older. The gender makeup of the city was 47.0% male and 53.0% female.

2000 census
As of the census of 2000, there were 5,346 people, 2,353 households, and 1,444 families living in the city. The racial makeup of the city was 97.10% White, 0.11% African American, 0.41% Native American, 0.34% Asian, 0.06% Pacific Islander, 0.80% from other races, and 1.18% from two or more races. Hispanic or Latino of any race were 2.00% of the population.

There were 2,353 households, out of which 28.6% had children under the age of 18 living with them, 48.6% were married couples living together, 9.2% had a female householder with no husband present, and 38.6% were non-families. 34.8% of all households were made up of individuals, and 18.3% had someone living alone who was 65 years of age or older. The average household size was 2.24 and the average family size was 2.89.

In the city, the population was spread out, with 24.5% under the age of 18, 8.0% from 18 to 24, 24.3% from 25 to 44, 22.6% from 45 to 64, and 20.6% who were 65 years of age or older. The median age was 40 years. For every 100 females, there were 89.2 males. For every 100 females age 18 and over, there were 86.3 males.

The median income for a household in the city was $32,447, and the median income for a family was $44,706. Males had a median income of $30,838 versus $19,013 for females. The per capita income for the city was $18,025. About 4.7% of families and 10.1% of the population were below the poverty line, including 12.2% of those under age 18 and 8.9% of those age 65 or over.

Sister City relationship

The relationship with Montevideo, Uruguay, began in 1905 when the mayor of each city sent a national flag to the other.

In popular culture
 Montevideo was featured in the 2005 film Sweet Land as the town Audubon, Minnesota, in the 1920s.
 Montevideo was a grand finalist in the Real World Road Rules Challenge 2000.

Local media
KDMA, KKRC, and KMGM are local radio stations owned by Iowa City Broadcasting Company, Inc. KRAM-LP is owned by Thunderhawk Broadcasting, Inc.

Notable people

Wayne Brabender (1945–), American-Spaniard professional basketball player for Real Madrid and the Spanish National Basketball team
Alfred M. Falkenhagen, Minnesota state legislator and farmer
Paul Gruchow (1947–2004), Former professor at St. Olaf and Concordia colleges, and former editor of the Worthington Daily Globe in Worthington. Essayist whose publications include Grass Roots: The Universe of Home (Milkweed Editions, 1995) and Boundary Waters: The Grace of the Wild. He was a contributing writer to several periodicals including the New York Times and the Hungry Mind Review.
Vernon K. Jensen (1912–1982), veterinarian and Minnesota state senator.
David Minge (1942–), Former 2nd District congressman (1993–2001) and current judge on the Minnesota Court of Appeals.

References

External links

City of Montevideo, MN – Official Website
Montevideo, MN Chamber of Commerce
Montevideo Public Schools
Montevideo American-News site
Milwaukee Road Heritage Center site
Montevideo Industrial Development Corporation
"Verdi Gilbertson History
Montevideo, Minnesota Police Department

Cities in Chippewa County, Minnesota
Cities in Minnesota
County seats in Minnesota
1870 establishments in Minnesota